Chase McDonald Rettig (born September 26, 1991) is an American football quarterback who is currently a free agent. He played college football at Boston College.  He was the starting quarterback for the Boston College Eagles from 2010 to 2013. His younger brother Hayden played quarterback at Rutgers University. Chase was signed by the Green Bay Packers after going undrafted in 2014.

Early life 
Rettig is the son of Mark and Carol Rettig, the second-oldest of their three sons.  He played football at LaSalle High School in Pasadena, California prior to his senior season, when he played for San Clemente High School in San Clemente, California.  Rettig transferred to San Clemente to be closer to his father's place of business.  In two years at LaSalle he threw for 3,800 yards and 40 touchdowns.  He earned All-Camino Real League first-team honors in 2007 and 2008, and All-State Underclassman first-team honors in his sophomore year.  In his senior season at San Clemente, Rettig threw for 1,748 yards and 18 touchdowns, earning All-South Coast League first-team and Orange County All-Academic first-team honors.  Rettig played in the Under Armour All-American Game at Tropicana Field in Saint Petersburg, Florida on January 2, 2010.  He chose Boston College over Tennessee and USC.

College career 
Rettig made his debut at BC playing against Notre Dame in the third game of the 2010 season.  He made a 58-yard touchdown pass to Bobby Swigert but had to leave the game due to an ankle injury.  After missing the following game, Rettig earned the starting quarterback job and led the Eagles to the 2011 Kraft Fight Hunger Bowl, where he completed 14 of 34 passes for 121 yards; the Eagles lost to Nevada 20-13.  Rettig threw for 1,238 yards and six touchdowns during the season.

For the 2011 season, Rettig chose to change his jersey number from 7 to 11, his high school number and the number of his high school quarterbacks coach.  He started all twelve games of the season, throwing for 1,960 yards and twelve touchdowns.

Despite going 2-10 in the 2012 season, Rettig started all 12 games and threw for 3,055 yards and 17 touchdowns on the season. His season QB rating was a career-high 115.6. He connected with junior wide receiver Alex Amidon 78 times in his breakout season for 1,210 yards.

As a senior in 2013, Rettig threw for 1,995 yards and 17 touchdowns. He finished his career with 8,248 passing yards and 52 touchdowns.

Professional career

Green Bay Packers
After going undrafted in the 2014 NFL Draft, Rettig signed with the Green Bay Packers on May 12, 2014. He was released on August 24, 2014.

San Diego Chargers
Chase Rettig signed with the San Diego Chargers on May 20, 2015, and was released by them in August, 2015.

References

External links 

 
 Boston College Eagles bio

1991 births
Living people
American football quarterbacks
Boston College Eagles football players
Sportspeople from Los Angeles County, California
Players of American football from California
People from San Clemente, California
Sportspeople from Orange County, California
People from Sierra Madre, California
Green Bay Packers players
San Diego Chargers players